McMinn County is a county in the U.S. state of Tennessee. It is located in East Tennessee. As of the 2020 census, the population was 53,794. Most of the county is within the Ridge and Valley province of the Appalachian Mountains. Its county seat is Athens. McMinn County comprises the Athens, TN Micropolitan Statistical Area.

History
McMinn County was created in 1819 from Indian lands and was named in honor of Joseph McMinn (1758–1824). McMinn was a militia commander during the Revolutionary War, a member of the territorial legislature, speaker of the state senate, and eventually governor of the state of Tennessee. McMinn died on October 17, 1824, and is buried at Shiloh Presbyterian Cemetery in Calhoun.

The first railroad in East Tennessee, the Hiwassee Railroad, began construction in McMinn County in the late 1830s, but was halted due to financial difficulties.  Work was resumed by the East Tennessee and Georgia Railroad (ET&G) in 1849, and by the mid-1850s rail lines connected Chattanooga, Knoxville, and the Tri-Cities. The ET&G was headquartered in Athens before moving to Knoxville in 1855.  A train depot from this early railroad period still stands in Niota. A number of communities sprang up along the railroads in subsequent years, most notably Etowah, where the L&N built a large depot in the early 1900s, and Englewood, which developed into a textile manufacturing center in the late 19th and early 20th centuries.

Like many East Tennessee counties, McMinn was polarized by the Civil War and the issue of secession. On June 8, 1861, the county voted against secession by a margin of 1,144 to 904.  The county provided 12 regiments for the Union Army and eight for the Confederate Army during the course of the war.

On August 14, 1920, in a long and bitter debate on the suffrage amendment at the Tennessee State Capitol, State Senator Hershel Candler of McMinn County denounced suffrage leader Carrie Chapman Catt on the floor of the state senate, saying Catt “would be glad to see the day when negro men could marry white women without being socially ostracized. This is the kind of woman who is trying to dictate to us. They would drag the womanhood of Tennessee down to the level of the negro woman."

In August 1946, an uprising known as the Battle of Athens erupted when the McMinn County sheriff and several other county officials (most of whom had ties to Memphis political boss E.H. Crump) attempted to fix local elections.  A group of World War II veterans launched an armed assault on the jail in Athens, where the county  officials had retreated with the ballot boxes.  After an exchange of gunfire, the county officials turned over the ballot boxes, and the votes were counted in a public setting.

On December 11, 1990, a crash involving 99 vehicles occurred along Interstate 75 near Calhoun in heavy fog, killing 12 and injuring 42. The accident, which occurred in an area prone to fog, was reportedly the largest motor vehicle crash in United States history at the time, in terms of the number of vehicles involved, and was blamed by some on the nearby Bowater (now Resolute Forest Products) paper mill.

McMinn County came to worldwide attention in January 2022, on International Holocaust Remembrance Day, when the county's Board of Education voted unanimously to remove the Pulitzer Prize-winning graphic novel Maus from its curriculum over concerns about offensive words. The book, featuring Nazis as cats and Jews as mice, received a special Pulitzer Prize in 1992. Art Spiegelman wrote and illustrated the book based on his parents’ experience in Nazi-occupied Poland and later at Auschwitz.

Geography

Most of the county is within the Ridge and Valley province of the Appalachian Mountains, which is characterized by a series of parallel ridges separated by valleys oriented in a northeast-to-southwest direction. The Hiwassee River forms the county's border with Bradley County to the southwest. Starr Mountain, a large ridge in the southeastern part of the county on the edge of the Unicoi Mountains, part of the Blue Ridge Appalachian province, forms part of the county's border with Polk County to the south and Monroe County to the north and east.

Adjacent counties

Roane County (north)
Loudon County (northeast)
Monroe County (east)
Polk County (southeast)
Bradley County (southwest)
Meigs County (west)

National protected area
Cherokee National Forest (part)

State protected area
Chickamauga Wildlife Management Area (part)

Demographics

2022
In 2022, USA Today reported that the poverty rate of the county was 19.2% (the national median rate was 14.2%), its violent crime rate was 515 (the national median was 205), its teen birth rate was 36.1/1k (the national average was 22.5), preschool enrollment was 26.2% (the national average was 39.2%), its Toxic Release Index score was 60,713 (national median was 110), and 39% of the population was fully vaccinated against COVID-19.

2020 census

As of the 2020 United States census, there were 53,794 people, 20,804 households, and 13,685 families residing in the county.

2010 census

As of the census of 2010, there were 52,266 people, 20,865 households, and 14,632 families living in the county. The population density was 121.55 persons per square mile and the housing unit density was 48.52 units per square mile. The racial makeup of the county was 91.96% White, 3.95% Black, 0.34% Native American, 0.74% Asian, 0.02% Pacific Islander, and 1.79% from two or more races. Those of Hispanic of Latino origins made up 2.84% of the population.

Of all of the households, 26.93% had children under the age of 18 living in them, 53.88% were married couples living together, 4.86% had a male householder with no wife present, 11.38% had a female householder with no husband present, and 29.87% were non families. 26.02% of all households were made up of individuals, and 11.65% had someone living alone who was 65 years of age or older. The average household size was 2.46 and the average family size was 2.94.

The population was distributed with 22.57% under the age of 18, 60.57% ages 18 to 64, and 16.86% age 65 years and older. The median age was 40.4 years. 51.43% of the population were females and 48.57% were males.

The median household income was $37,146 and the median family income was $47,726. Males had a median income of $38,459 versus $31,342 for females. The per capita income for the county was $19,796. About 13.7% of families and 17.3% of the population were below the poverty line, including 24.0% of those under the age of 18 and 11.9% of those over the age of 65.

2000 census

At the 2000 census, there were 49,015 people, 19,721 households and 14,317 families living in the county. The population density was 114 per square mile (44/km2). There were 21,626 housing units at an average density of 50 per square mile (19/km2).  

The racial makeup of the county was 92.72% White, 4.48% Black or African American, 0.27% Native American, 0.70% Asian, 0.02% Pacific Islander, 0.75% from other races, and 1.06% from two or more races.  1.80% of the population were Hispanic or Latino of any race.

There were 19,721 households, of which 31.40% had children under the age of 18 living with them, 58.70% were married couples living together, 10.60% had a female householder with no husband present, and 27.40% were non-families. 24.40% of all households were made up of individuals, and 10.40% had someone living alone who was 65 years of age or older. The average household size was 2.45, and the average family size was 2.90.

Age distribution was 23.90% under the age of 18, 8.40% from 18 to 24, 28.50% from 25 to 44, 24.80% from 45 to 64, and 14.30% who were 65 years of age or older. The median age was 38 years. For every 100 females there were 93.40 males. For every 100 females age 18 and over, there were 89.80 males.

The median household income was $31,919, and the median family income was $38,992. Males had a median income of $31,051 versus $20,524 for females. The per capita income for the county was $16,725. About 10.90% of families and 14.50% of the population were below the poverty line, including 18.20% of those under age 18 and 16.80% of those age 65 or over.

Communities

Cities

Athens (county seat)
Etowah
Niota
Sweetwater

Towns
Calhoun
Englewood

Census-designated place
Riceville

Unincorporated communities

Claxton
Conasauga
 Goodsprings
 Liberty Hill
 Mount Verd
Reagan
Regret (historical)
Spring Creek
Williamsburg

Schools

The 1870 Tennessee constitution prevented black and white children from attending the same public schools. In 1875, McMinn County had 56 white schools and 10 "colored" schools. After the Civil Rights Act of 1964 was passed, Tennessee began to integrate schools.

McMinn County Schools operates public schools serving most of the county for grades K-12. Included are McMinn County High School and McMinn Central High School. 
In 2020, the district had 5,493 students. It had two high schools, seven middle schools, seven elementary schools, and seven preschools. As of 2022, a total of 31% of elementary school students tested at or above the proficient level for reading, and 40% tested did so for math. Also, 31% of middle school students tested at or above the proficient level for reading, and 40% did so for math. Furthermore 34% of high school students tested at or above the proficient level for reading, and 22% did so for math.

Athens City Schools and the Etowah School District, respectively, serve their areas for grades K-8, with McMinn County Schools operating the high schools for those respective cities.

Politics
In the 2020 US presidential election, 79.7% of voters in the county voted for Donald Trump, who attracted 46.9% of the vote nationwide. Following Trump in the county vote were Democrat Joe Biden, Libertarian Jo Jorgensen, coal mining business executive Don Blankenship, and rapper Kanye West.

See also
National Register of Historic Places listings in McMinn County, Tennessee

References

Further reading
 Byrum, Stephen C.  McMinn County.  Memphis: Memphis State University Press (1984). .
 Guy, Joe. The Hidden History of McMinn County: Tales From Eastern Tennessee. Charleston: The History Press (2007). .

External links

 Official site
 McMinn County, TNGenWeb – free genealogy resources for the county
 

 
1819 establishments in Tennessee
Populated places established in 1819
Counties of Appalachia
East Tennessee